This is a list of the U.S. Billboard magazine Streaming Songs number-ones of 2013.

Chart history

See also
2013 in music
List of Billboard Hot 100 number-one singles of 2013

References

External links
Current Billboard Streaming Songs chart

United States Streaming
Streaming 2013